Cihan Özkara (born 14 July 1991) is a German-born Azerbaijani professional footballer who plays as a forward for German club Rot Weiss Ahlen.

Career 
Özkara was born in Hamm. He began his career with LR Ahlen and played eight years before joining Arminia Bielefeld in summer 2007. After one year with Arminia Bielefeld, he returned to Rot Weiss Ahlen where he made his senior debut on 22 September 2009 against Greuther Fürth in the DFB-Pokal. He signed on 6 October 2009 his first professional contract until 30 June 2012.

On 30 January 2015, Özkara signed for Simurq PIK on loan till the end of the 2014–15 season.

On 4 September 2020, Özkara a three-year contract with İstanbulspor.

Career statistics

Score and result list Azerbaijan's goal tally first, score column indicates score after each Özkara goal.

References

External links
 
 
 

1991 births
Sportspeople from Hamm
Footballers from North Rhine-Westphalia
Azerbaijani people of Turkish descent
German people of Turkish descent
German people of Azerbaijani descent
Living people
German footballers
Azerbaijani footballers
Azerbaijan international footballers
Association football forwards
Rot Weiss Ahlen players
Sivasspor footballers
Kayseri Erciyesspor footballers
Simurq PIK players
SC Preußen Münster players
SC Verl players
Rot-Weiß Oberhausen players
İstanbulspor footballers
Sarıyer S.K. footballers
2. Bundesliga players
3. Liga players
Regionalliga players
Süper Lig players
TFF First League players
Azerbaijan Premier League players
TFF Second League players
Azerbaijani expatriate footballers
German expatriate footballers
Expatriate footballers in Turkey
Azerbaijani expatriate sportspeople in Turkey
German expatriate sportspeople in Turkey